Orinomana is a genus of spiders in the family Uloboridae. It was first described in 1934 by Strand. , it contains 7 South American species.

Species

Orinomana comprises the following species:
Orinomana ascha Grismado, 2000
Orinomana bituberculata (Keyserling, 1881)
Orinomana florezi Grismado & Rubio, 2015
Orinomana galianoae Grismado, 2000
Orinomana mana Opell, 1979
Orinomana penelope Grismado & Rubio, 2015
Orinomana viracocha Grismado & Rubio, 2015

References

Uloboridae
Araneomorphae genera
Spiders of South America